The 2017 FIBA Intercontinental Cup was the 27th edition of the FIBA Intercontinental Cup. The cup winner was decided through one game, which was held on September 24, 2017. It was contested by the 2017 FIBA Americas League champions, Guaros de Lara, and the 2017 FIBA Champions League champions, Iberostar Tenerife. The title game was held at the Santiago Martín, in San Cristóbal de La Laguna. Champions of the EuroLeague were not allowed to participate by FIBA, due to the EuroLeague's dispute with FIBA.

Iberostar Tenerife won the game, and captured its first FIBA Intercontinental Cup title. Mike Tobey was named the FIBA Intercontinental Cup Most Valuable Player.

Qualified teams

Venue

Match details

MVP

 Mike Tobey - ( Iberostar Tenerife)

References

External links
2017 Intercontinental Basketball Cup
 FIBA official website
 FIBA Intercontinental Cup official website 
 FIBA Intercontinental Cup History
 Basquetepinheirense FIBA World Cup 
 FIBA World Cup of Clubs 

2017
2017 in basketball
International basketball competitions hosted by Spain